Efraín David Fines Nevares (born October 5, 1981) known professionally as Tito "El Bambino" is a Puerto Rican singer and songwriter who rose to fame as part of the duo Héctor & Tito.

In 2010, his song, "El Amor", written with Joan Ortiz Espada, was awarded Latin Song of the Year by the American Society of Composers, Authors and Publishers (ASCAP). He was awarded Songwriter of the Year at the 2011 ASCAP.

Musical career

1996–2004: Héctor & Tito
Tito and his partner released a number of hit songs in their native Puerto Rico, including "Amor de Colegio" (ft. Don Omar), "Felina", "Baila Morena" (ft. Glory), and "No Le Temas a Él", a song which not only raised their popularity, it helped raise popularity for the then up-and-coming Trebol Clan. After years of working together, they separated, but not before releasing a final album, Season Finale, which featured some of their greatest hits. The duo broke up due to Tito's belief of disloyalty from Hector. 

Héctor & Tito released their first album in 1998. Together they became reggaeton stars after releasing several successful albums and making appearances in several compilations. They became one of the most sought-out duos in the genre. Both became the first reggaeton artists to sell out a massive concert in Puerto Rico, opening the path to other artists such as Tego Calderón, Daddy Yankee and others.

2004–2006: Solo career and Top of the Line
After much delay, his first solo album was released, Top of the Line. The album was a hit, reaching No. 1 in Puerto Rico.

Top of the Line featured 20 new songs, with collaboration from artists such as Daddy Yankee, Don Omar and Beenie Man. It featured quite a number of hits, such as "Caile", "Mía" (ft. Daddy Yankee), "Tu Cintura" (ft. Don Omar), "Flow Natural" (ft. Beenie Man and Deevani) "Secreto", "Máximo", "Tuve Que Morir" and "Me Da Miedo" among others.

Top of the Line/El Internacional is a limited edition of Tito's first album Top of the Line. It features five bonus new songs that were not included in the original version: "Siente El Boom (Remix)", "Enamorado", "Calentándote", "Bailarlo" and "Voy a Mí". The first single of the album is "Siente El Boom (Remix)" that is a big hit in Argentina. "Siente El Boom" is also on Chosen Few II: El Documental featuring Randy. 

In Top of The Line: El Internacional, the remix features Randy, along with his partner Jowell, & De La Ghetto. The second single recently released, "Enamorado", did not get a lot of airplay as "Siente El Boom" was still a hit on Puerto Rico's radio stations. "Siente El Boom" expanded throughout Latin America, peaking at No. 14 in the Billboard Hot Latin charts. Apparently "Enamorado" got cancelled and now the third single is "Bailarlo" that's starting to get airplay on the radio and a video has already been released.

2007–2008: It's My Time
It's My Time is the second album by Tito "El Bambino" released on October 2, 2007. The first single "Solo Dime que Sí" received notable airplay on the radio. The artists featured on It's My Time are R.K.M & Ken-Y in "Fans", Pharrell in "Booty", Toby Love in "La Busco", Jadiel in "Sol, Playa y Arena" with Arcangel and Franco "El Gorila" on the remix and with many other hits like "En La Disco"  Olga Tañón on the remix and "El Tra".

2009–2010: El Patrón
El Patrón is Tito El Bambino's third solo CD. The hit, "Vamos Pa'l Agua", was released before the CD to let fans know what lay ahead, but was ultimately not included in the album. The CD includes his fellow reggaeton artists Zion y Lennox and Plan B. Some chart toppers of this album include "El Amor" and "Under", which also have chart topping videos. "El Amor" was officially remixed four times with four different artists: Yolandita Monge, Jenni Rivera, Chiky Flow, and La India.

In February 2011, Tito El Bambino's label, On Fire Music approached producer duo group GrüvStar to create the official dance remix of the song "Llueve El Amor" to support the record during mix show play at Latin Urban radio stations.

Tito is also trying his hand as a producer, with his label On Fire Music.

2011-2012: El Patrón: Invencible
His younger brother now known in his disc, "Invencible", by his artist name, Emanuel El Bambi. Tito has said that he will still be doing this type of music 10 years from now.

2012-2013: Invicto
On May 26, 2012, Tito released the first promotional single of the album called "Dame La Ola", and a month after, he released the video of this single. In October, Tito released "Por Qué Les Mientes", a duet with Marc Anthony, as the single for his new album. On November 19, 2012, he released his new album Invicto, and on the same day, Tito also released the music video for "Por Qué Les Mientes".

2014-present: Alta Jerarquía
On November 24, 2014, Tito released his sixth studio album titled Alta Jerarquía, of which three singles were released: "A Que No Te Atreves", "Controlando" and "Adicto a Tus Redes". On March 13, 2015, performed a successful concert at the José Miguel Agrelot Coliseum in Puerto Rico, along with numerous singers, intended to promote his album. In 2020 he released a song "Mueve La Cintura" ft. Guru Randhawa and Pitbull (rapper)

2020-present: El Muñeco
On December 16, 2020, Tito released his seventh studio album titled El Muñeco, of which two singles were released: "I Love You" featuring Jay Wheeler and "Por Ti" featuring Lenny Tavarez.

Discography

Top of the Line (2006)
It's My Time (2007)
El Patrón (2009)
Invencible (2011)
Invicto (2013)
Alta Jerarquía (2014)
El Muñeco (2020)

Group music
Héctor & Tito (1996-2004)

References

External links 
Official Website: English/Spanish
Official MySpace
Official Youtube Channel
Tito El Bambino, Artista Destacado - Billboard En Español

1981 births
Living people
21st-century Puerto Rican male singers
Puerto Rican reggaeton musicians
People from Carolina, Puerto Rico
Latin Grammy Award winners
EMI Televisa Music artists
Latin music songwriters
Reggaeton record producers